The following is a list of episodes of the Irish television crime drama series Love/Hate, first broadcast on RTÉ One in 2010, and running for a total of twenty-eight episodes across five series. Proving to be one of the most popular series on Irish television since the millennium, the final two episodes of the second series first drew notoriety after attracting more than 600,000 viewers each. Following this, the series continued to attract a high level of viewing figures, with the final episode of the fifth series attracting more than a million viewers. In November 2015, RTÉ stated that there were no plans to make a sixth series, thus bringing the show to a close.

Episodes

Series 1 (2010)

Series 2 (2011)

Series 3 (2012)

Series 4 (2013)

Series 5 (2014)

References

Episode list using the default LineColor
Lists of Irish drama television series episodes
Lists of crime television series episodes
Television episodes set in the Republic of Ireland